Fountain Green Township is one of twenty-four townships in Hancock County, Illinois, USA.  As of the 2010 census, its population was 288 and it contained 145 housing units.

Geography

Unincorporated towns
 Fountain Green at 
 La Crosse at 
 Webster at 
(This list is based on USGS data and may include former settlements.)

Cemeteries
The township contains these four cemeteries: Fountain Green, Lincoln Catholic, McConnell and Wright.

Demographics

School districts
 West Prairie Community Unit School District 103

Political districts
 Illinois's 18th congressional district
 State House District 94
 State Senate District 47

References
 United States Census Bureau 2008 TIGER/Line Shapefiles
 
 United States National Atlas

External links
 City-Data.com
 Illinois State Archives
 Township Officials of Illinois

Townships in Hancock County, Illinois
Townships in Illinois
1849 establishments in Illinois